Anusandhan is a 2021 Indian Bengali-language psychological thriller film directed by Kamaleshwar Mukherjee for Bigscreen Films Limited. Starring Saswata Chatterjee, Churni Ganguly and Joydeep Mukherjee, the film is an adaptation of a play directed by Kamaleswar himself. The movie is an adaptation of the 1956 novel A Dangerous Game by Friedrich Dürrenmatt which has earlier been adapted in Marathi as Shantata! Court Chalu Aahe (1971), in Kannada as Male Nilluvavarege (2015) and in Hindi as Chehre (2021). The film was released theatrically on 3 December 2021.

Cast
 Saswata Chatterjee as Indra
 Payel Sarkar as Papiya
 Churni Ganguly as Judge
 Joydip Mukherjee 
 Riddhi Sen as prosecutor
 Priyanka Sarkar as lawyer
 Kamaleswar Mukherjee as Indra’s ex-boss 
Joy Bhowmik as Aritra Mukherjee
Dipanshu Kant
Seher Bhowmik

Production
The production crew and cast of the film flew to London on 13 September 2020 for London schedule of filming. The filming post COVID-19 pandemic resumed in various locations around London on 16 September 2020. The schedule was wrapped up in September end.

Soundtrack
Soundtrack is composed by Anupam Roy on his own lyrics. The single track was released on 20 November 2021.

Reception
Upam Buzarbaruah of The Times of India rated the film with 3 stars out of five and praised the screenplay of Kamleshwar and performance of Saswata Chatterjee, writing, "strength of the film, however, lies in its cast. Saswata has outdone himself in certain parts." He appreciated the music saying, "melodious soundtracks by Anupam Roy are nice breaks from the darkness of the trial". Concluding Buzarbaruah wrote, "Anusandhan is your chance to watch good cinema in a theatre after the long dull break. And yes, it is a really good watch."

References

External links
 

Bengali-language Indian films
Films directed by Kamaleshwar Mukherjee
Films scored by Anupam Roy
Films shot in London
Indian psychological thriller films
Films based on works by Friedrich Dürrenmatt
Indian courtroom films